Zach Mako (born December 17, 1988) is an American politician who has served in the Pennsylvania House of Representatives from the 183rd district since 2017.

References

1988 births
Living people
Republican Party members of the Pennsylvania House of Representatives
21st-century American politicians